Greer Spring is a first magnitude spring located in the southeast portion of the Ozark Plateau, in Oregon County in south-central Missouri within the boundaries of the Mark Twain National Forest. Greer Spring was designated a National Natural Landmark in 1980.

The spring outlet

The spring emerges at the bottom of a narrow chasm. An upper outlet flowing from a cavern is only a fraction of Greer Spring's large flow. Greer Spring greatly increases the flow of the river, ensuring ample water for recreational activities, such as boating, even in the dry months. The vast amount of spring water changes the Eleven Point River into a coldwater stream for several miles downstream. The spring's cold water also creates ideal conditions for trout. The mouth of the spring branch is roughly 0.5 miles upstream (west) of the Missouri Route 19 bridge over the Eleven Point River. Greer Spring may be the most secluded and undisturbed big spring in the Ozarks. The spring has been owned by the U.S. National Forest Service since 1993. Before 1993 the spring was in the caring hands of private ownership. The area surrounding the spring has been retaken by nature, but had a small fish hatchery and roads many years ago, the site has remained very scenic and unspoiled.

Access
The United States National Forest Service maintains a trail to the spring. A parking area on the side of Highway 19 provides parking for the trail. Visitors to the spring are common despite a mile-long hike.

History
The first gristmill on the spring branch was built by Captain Samuel Greer in 1859.  The spring was subsequently named after the Confederate captain.  The mill was later destroyed during the American Civil War, however the mill was rebuilt.  Sometime after 1883, the old mill was removed to make way for a new roller mill completed sometime before 1899.  The mill changed ownership until 1922, when it ceased operation.  Very few remains of mill operations exist today near the spring.  The mill itself is still standing near the top of east side of the gorge, despite very little attention.  As of 2016, work is well underway with help from the U.S. Forest Service, HistoriCorps for the mill restoration project.  Difficult access, private ownership, and a remote location have all aided in protecting this karst location.

See also
List of Ozark springs
Mark Twain National Forest
Karst spring

References

External links

Mark Twain National Forest, Greer Spring and Trail
Peak Streamflow for Missouri USGS 07071000 Greer Spring at Greer, MO
USGS Surface-Water Annual Statistics for Missouri USGS 07071000 Greer Spring at Greer, MO

Protected areas of Oregon County, Missouri
Springs of Missouri
Mark Twain National Forest
National Natural Landmarks in Missouri
Bodies of water of Oregon County, Missouri